Mario de Souza Mota (born August 8, 1958 in São Paulo, Brazil), known as Bahía, is a Brazilian former footballer who played as a striker with Monterrey in Mexico from 1984 to 1992. He was part of the team that won the 1986 championship. Until 2012 he was the club's all-time top scorer with 96 goals in all competitions.

References

1958 births
Living people
Brazilian footballers
Liga MX players
C.F. Monterrey players
Association football forwards
Footballers from São Paulo